The Asian Monetary Unit (AMU) is a basket of currencies proposed by the Japanese government's Research Institute of Economy, Trade and Industry (RIETI). It is similar to and modeled on the European Currency Unit (ECU), predecessor to the euro.

The Asian Monetary Unit, which has been created as the joint project of 21st century COE project of Hitotsubashi University and RIETI, is a common currency basket composed of 13 East Asian currencies, such as ASEAN 10 plus Japan, China and South Korea. These data have been published on the website of RIETI since September 2005. After 4 years passed, a common currency basket composed of 13 AMU currencies plus three other countries, Australia, New Zealand and India, which are strongly connected with Asian countries, is newly created as "AMU-wide". The AMU-wide, which is a common currency basket composed of wider range of currencies, will be expected to use as a surveillance indicator corresponding to the extensive regional economies.

The calculation methodology of the AMU-wide and AMU-wide Deviation Indicators are same as those of the AMU. The benchmark period is defined as:
 the total trade balance of member countries, and
 the total trade balance of the member countries (excluding Japan) with Japan, and
 the total trade balance of member countries with the rest of world

should all be relatively close to zero.

AMU baskets
The AMU is a basket composed of 13 currencies.

See also

 Regional Comprehensive Economic Partnership
 Monetary union
 Chiang Mai Initiative
 Asian Clearing Union

References

External links
 Daily value of AMU from RIETI
 AMU (Asian Monetary Unit) and AMU Deviation Indicators
 ASEAN mulls single currency

ASEAN
Currencies of Asia